K. J. Maye (born February 25, 1994) is a former American football wide receiver. He played college football at Minnesota, and was originally signed by the New York Giants of the National Football League (NFL) as an undrafted free agent in 2016. He has also been a member of the Tennessee Titans, Edmonton Eskimos, New England Patriots, and Tampa Bay Vipers.

College statistics
Source:

Professional career

New York Giants
Maye went undrafted in the 2016 NFL Draft. On April 30, 2016, he signed with the New York Giants as an undrafted free agent. On August 30, 2016, he was waived by the Giants.

Tennessee Titans
On December 28, 2016, Maye was signed to the Titans' practice squad. He signed a reserve/future contract with the Titans on January 2, 2017.

On May 19, 2017, Maye was waived by the Titans.

New England Patriots
On July 30, 2017, Maye signed with the New England Patriots. He was waived by the Patriots on September 2, 2017.

On August 27, 2018, Maye was re-signed by the Patriots. On September 1, Maye was released as part of the roster cutdown.

Tampa Bay Vipers
Maye was selected by the Tampa Bay Vipers of the XFL during the final stage of the league's inaugural draft on October 16, 2019. He signed a contract with the team on December 22, 2019. He was waived during final roster cuts on January 22, 2020.

References

External links
Minnesota Golden Gophers bio

1994 births
Living people
Players of American football from Alabama
Sportspeople from Mobile, Alabama
Minnesota Golden Gophers football players
New York Giants players
Tennessee Titans players
New England Patriots players
Tampa Bay Vipers players